Litke Strait (Proliv Litke) is a strait in the Karaginsky Gulf in the Bering Sea, located off the northeastern coast of the Kamchatka Peninsula, in Kamchatka Krai of the Russian Far East. It separates the Karaginsky Island from the peninsula's mainland. 

The strait is named after explorer Fyodor Petrovich Litke.

References 

Straits of Russia
Straits of the Pacific Ocean
Bodies of water of the Kamchatka Peninsula
Bodies of water of the Bering Sea